Knema minima is a species of plant in the Myristicaceae (nutmeg) family.  It is endemic to Brunei.

References

minima
Endemic flora of Brunei
Vulnerable flora of Asia
Taxonomy articles created by Polbot